Daniel Herren Sr. (August 6, 1888 – August 15, 1956) was an American football player and coach. He served as the head football coach at Troy State Normal School—now known as Troy University—in 1910, compiling a record of 1–1–2.  Herren played college football at Auburn University, where he was also a civil engineering assistant faculty member from 1909 to 1910.

Head coaching record

References

External links
 

1888 births
1956 deaths
American football halfbacks
Auburn Tigers football players
Troy Trojans football coaches
People from Tallassee, Alabama
Players of American football from Alabama